Vilborg Sverrisdóttir (born 19 June 1957) is an Icelandic former freestyle  swimmer. She competed in three events at the 1976 Summer Olympics.

References

External links
 

1957 births
Living people
Vilborg Sverrisdottir
Vilborg Sverrisdottir
Swimmers at the 1976 Summer Olympics
Place of birth missing (living people)